The East Asian Football Federation (EAFF), founded on 28 May 2002, is an international governing body of association football in East Asia.

Presidents

Member associations
EAFF has 10 member associations. All of them are members of the Asian Football Confederation, including the Northern Mariana Islands Football Association, which is an associate member of the AFC (previously an associated member of the Oceania Football Confederation) until its full membership was approved in December 2020. The Palau Football Association was being considered as a possible future member of the association in 2009. Northern Mariana Islands national football team was a  provisional member from December 2006 to September 2008.

Sponsors

FIFA World Rankings

Men's national teams

Rankings are calculated by FIFA.

Women's national teams

Rankings are calculated by FIFA.

Competitions

Current title holders

Tournament record
Legend
 – Champion
 – Runner-up
 – Third place
 – Fourth place
QF – Quarterfinals
R16 – Round of 16 (since 1986: knockout round of 16)
GS – Group stage (in the 1950, 1974, 1978, and 1982 tournaments, which had two group stages, this refers to the first group stage)
1S – First knockout stage (1934–1938 Single-elimination tournament)
 — Qualified for upcoming tournament
 — Did not qualify
 — Did not enter / withdrawn / banned / disqualified
 — Hosts

For each tournament, the flag of the host country and the number of teams in each finals tournament (in brackets) are shown.

FIFA World Cup

FIFA Women's World Cup

Olympic Games For Women

Olympic Games For Men

See also
 FIFA
 Asian Football Confederation (AFC)
 ASEAN Football Federation (AFF)
 Central Asian Football Association (CAFA)
 South Asian Football Federation (SAFF)
 West Asian Football Federation (WAFF)

References

External links
 Official website 

East Asian Football Federation